is the 5th single by Japanese heavy metal band Dir En Grey released on July 14, 1999. It was used as the ending theme for the Yomiuri TV and Nippon TV drama, " Nothing lasts forever / Female doctor". The song attracted mainstream attention by appearing on Japanese Music Stations, notably Music Station, Popjapan.tv, and Count Down TV.

Track listing
All lyrics are written by Kyo; Music composed by Dir En Grey.

Personnel 
 Dir En Grey
 Kyo – vocals, lyricist
 Kaoru – guitar
 Die – guitar
 Toshiya – bass guitar
 Shinya – drums
 Yoshiki Hayashi – producer
 Toru Yamazaki – co-producer
 Chris Vrenna - remixing

References 

1999 singles
Dir En Grey songs
Songs written by Kyo (musician)
1999 songs
East West Records singles